Koung-Khi is a department of West Province in Cameroon. The department covers an area of 353 km and as of 2005 had a total population of 65,021. The capital of the department is Bandjoun. The department was created in 1995 when the Mifi department was split up.

Subdivisions
The department is divided administratively into 3 communes and in turn into villages.

Communes 
 Bayangam
 Bandjoun
 Demding (or Demdeng)

Towns or villages 
 Bandrefam
 Batoufam

References

Departments of Cameroon
West Region (Cameroon)